Sherman Hill may refer to:

 Sherman L. Hill (1911–1984), American politician
 Sherman Hill (New York), a mountain in the Catskills, US
 Sherman Hill Historic District, Des Moines, Iowa, US
 Sherman Hill Summit, a mountain pass near Sherman, Wyoming, US